was a Japanese breaststroke swimmer. He competed in the 1932 Summer Olympics. In 1932, he finished sixth in the 200 metre breaststroke event. He was born in Aichi Prefecture.

External links
 

1910 births
Year of death missing
Olympic swimmers of Japan
Swimmers at the 1932 Summer Olympics
Japanese male breaststroke swimmers